Sutton Lake may refer to:

Sutton Lake (North Carolina), a lake on the Cape Fear River
Sutton Lake (Oregon), a lake in Lane County, United States
Sutton Lake (West Virginia), a reservoir in Braxton and Webster counties, United States
Sutton Salt Lake, a lake in New Zealand's South Island